Meena Lee (born 25 December 1981) is a South Korean professional golfer who plays on the United States-based LPGA Tour.

Lee was born in Jeonju, South Korea. She took up golf at the age of fourteen, which is unusually late for a future professional golfer, but just a few years later, in 2000, she became the Korean Amateur Champion. She turned professional in 2002, one year before graduating from Yong-In University. She won three events on the LPGA of Korea Tour in her rookie season of 2002 and topped the money list. In 2003, she won one tournament and placed fifth on the money list.

In 2004, Lee played on the second-tier Futures Tour in the United States, finishing 23rd on the money list, but she was able to win an LPGA Tour card for 2005 by finishing tied for 25th at the LPGA Final Qualifying Tournament. She made a steady start to her rookie season and in July 2005 was a surprise finalist in the inaugural HSBC Women's World Match Play Championship, which she lost to Colombia's Marisa Baena by one hole. Two weeks later she won for the first time on the LPGA Tour at the BMO Financial Group Canadian Women's Open. On 25 February 2006 she won her second LPGA Tour title at the Fields Open in Hawaii.

Professional wins (6)

LPGA Tour (2) 

LPGA Tour playoff record (1–1)

KLPGA Tour (4)
2002 (3) SK EnClean Invitational, Hours Mall Invitational, Woori Stock Classic
2003 (1) Lakeside Open

Results in LPGA majors
Results not in chronological order before 2015.

CUT = missed the half-way cut
"T" = tied

Summary

Most consecutive cuts made – 10 (2013 U.S. Open – 2015 WPC)
Longest streak of top-10s – 1 (twice)

LPGA Tour career summary

 official through 2016 season

Team appearances
Professional
Lexus Cup (representing Asia team): 2005, 2006 (winners), 2007 (winners)
World Cup (representing South Korea): 2006

References

External links

Biography on seoulsisters.com

South Korean female golfers
LPGA Tour golfers
LPGA of Korea Tour golfers
Sportspeople from North Jeolla Province
People from Jeonju
1981 births
Living people